Three Rivers School District is a public school district that serves the Illinois Valley, Hidden Valley and North Valley regions of Jackson and Josephine counties in the U.S. state of Oregon, including parts of the city of Grants Pass, the city of Cave Junction, and the communities of Applegate, Williams and Wolf Creek.

History
The school district was formed when the Josephine County School District combined with the Applegate School District in 1994. The name refers to the Applegate, Illinois, and Rogue rivers.

Demographics
In the 2009 school year, the district had 298 students classified as homeless by the Department of Education, or 5.5% of students in the district.

Schools

Elementary schools
Applegate School (K-8) 
Evergreen Elementary School 
Fort Vannoy Elementary School 
Fruitdale Elementary School 
Madrona Elementary School 
Manzanita Elementary School 
Williams Elementary School 
Sunny Wolf Charter School
Woodland Charter School

Middle schools
Fleming Middle School 
Lincoln Savage Middle School 
Lorna Byrne Middle School

High schools
Hidden Valley High School 
Illinois Valley High School 
New Bridge High School 
North Valley High School

See also
Grants Pass School District

References

External links
www.threerivers.k12.or.us — Three Rivers School District (official site)

Education in Josephine County, Oregon
School districts in Oregon
Education in Jackson County, Oregon
Grants Pass, Oregon
1994 establishments in Oregon
School districts established in 1994